Mahmoud Fawzy (born June 20, 1992) is an Egyptian Greco-Roman wrestler and professional mixed martial artist.

Wrestling career
He is a 4 time Arab champion, 5 time African champion, won a gold medal at the African cup, best wrestler in Africa 2015, a silver medal in Nikolai bitrov Bulgaria January 2016, a silver medal in Spain Grand Prix May 2016, a bronze medal in Germany grand bronze tournament June 2016, and won silver medal at Dave Schultz tournament Colorado US January 2017. He competed in the men's Greco-Roman 75 kg event at the 2016 Summer Olympics, in which he was eliminated in the round of 32 by Elvin Mursaliyev.

In 2018, Sebie spoke out about corruption in his native Egyptian wrestling federation and claimed he will not compete for the Egypt's national team in wrestling anymore. He subsequently moved to United States in hopes to represent Team USA in 2020 Summer Olympics, but as COVID-19 pandemic postponed the Olympics, Mahmoud decided retire from the sport in 2020.

Mixed martial arts career

Early career
After he retired from wrestling, he was suggested by a friend to try mixed martial arts. In January 2021, news surfaced that Sebie was scheduled to make his professional debut against Jarell Murry at XMMA 8 on January 30, 2021. He won the fight via first-round technical knockout.

Fawzy made his sophomore walk to the cage against Enrique Hernandez Nagrete on June 11, 2021 at iKon Fighting Federation 7. He won the bout via knockout a minute into the bout.

On 7 days turnaround, Fawzy faced Eric Thompson at Gamebred Fighting Championship 1 on June 18, 2021. He won the bout via TKO in the first round.

Fawzy faced Ethan Hughes on November 12, 2021 at Bellator 271. He lost the bout via ground and pound TKO in the third round.

Fawzy faced Itso Babulaidze on August 5, 2022 at PFL 7. He lost the bout via TKO stoppage at the end of the first round.

Brave CF 
Fawzy made his Brave CF debut against Wajdi Missaoui on December 12, 2021 at BRAVE CF 67, knocking out his opponent in the first round.

Fawzy faced Muhammed Kir Ahmet on February 18, 2023 at BRAVE CF 69, knocking out his opponent 38 seconds into the bout.

Mixed martial arts record

|-
|Win
|align=center|5–2
|Muhammed Kir Ahmet
|KO (punches)
|BRAVE CF 69
|
|align=center|1
|align=center|0:38
|Belgrade, Serbia
|
|-
| Win
| align=center|4–2
| Wajdi Missaoui
| KO (punches)
| BRAVE CF 67
| 
| align=center|1
| align=center|1:28
| Manama, Bahrain
| 
|-
|Loss
|align=center| 3–2
|Itso Babulaidze
|TKO (punches)
|PFL 7
|
|align=center|1
|align=center|4:30
|New York City, New York, United States
|
|-
| Loss
| align=center| 3–1
| Ethan Hughes
| TKO (punches)
| Bellator 271
| 
| align=center|3 
| align=center|4:05
| Hollywood, Florida, United States
|
|-
|Win
|align=center|3–0
|Eric Thompson
|TKO (elbows and punches)
|Gamebred Fighting Championship 1
|
|align=center|1
|align=center|1:19
|Biloxi, Mississippi, United States
|
|-
|Win
|align=center|2–0
|Enrique Hernandez Negrete
|KO (punches) 
|iKon Fighting Federation 7
|
|align=center|1
|align=center|1:09
|Los Mochis, Mexico
|
|-
|Win
|align=center|1–0
|Jarell Murry
|TKO (punches)
|XMMA 1: Vick vs Fialho
|
|align=center|1
|align=center|1:52
|West Palm Beach, Florida, United States
|
|-

References

External links

1992 births
Living people
Egyptian male sport wrestlers
Olympic wrestlers of Egypt
Wrestlers at the 2016 Summer Olympics
Egyptian male mixed martial artists
Welterweight mixed martial artists
Mixed martial artists utilizing Greco-Roman wrestling